Lebanon participated in the 1982 Asian Games in Delhi, India on November 19 to December 4, 1982. Lebanon ended the games with single silver only.

References

Nations at the 1982 Asian Games
1982
Asian Games